In mathematics, potential flow around a circular cylinder is a classical solution for the flow of an inviscid, incompressible fluid around a cylinder that is transverse to the flow. Far from the cylinder, the flow is unidirectional and uniform. The flow has no vorticity and thus the velocity field is irrotational and can be modeled as a potential flow. Unlike a real fluid, this solution indicates a net zero drag on the body, a result known as d'Alembert's paradox.

Mathematical solution 

A cylinder (or disk) of radius  is placed in a two-dimensional, incompressible, inviscid flow. The goal is to find the steady velocity vector  and pressure  in a plane, subject to the condition that far from the cylinder the velocity vector (relative to unit vectors  and ) is:

where  is a constant, and at the boundary of the cylinder

where  is the vector normal to the cylinder surface. The upstream flow is uniform and has no vorticity. The flow is inviscid, incompressible and has constant mass density . The flow therefore remains without vorticity, or is said to be irrotational, with  everywhere. Being irrotational, there must exist a velocity potential :

Being incompressible, so  must satisfy Laplace's equation:

In polar coordinates, Laplace's equation is (see Del in cylindrical and spherical coordinates):

The solution that satisfies the boundary conditions is

and

Being inviscid and irrotational, Bernoulli's equation allows the solution for pressure field to be obtained directly from the velocity field:

where the constants  and  appear so that  far from the cylinder, where . Using ,

In the figures, the colorized field referred to as "pressure" is a plot of

Stream function 

The flow being incompressible, a stream function can be found such that

It follows from this definition, using vector identities,

For the flow past a cylinder, we find:

Physical interpretation 

Laplace's equation is linear, and is one of the most elementary partial differential equations. This simple equation yields the entire solution for both  and  because of the constraint of irrotationality and incompressibility.

This same value appears at the downstream stagnation point, this high pressure is again needed to decelerate the flow to zero speed. This symmetry arises only because the flow is completely frictionless.

The low pressure on sides on the cylinder is needed to provide the centripetal acceleration of the flow:

where  is the radius of curvature of the flow. The integral of the equation for centripetal acceleration over a distance  will thus yield

The exact solution has, for the lowest pressure,

The low pressure, which must be present to provide the centripetal acceleration, will also increase the flow speed as the fluid travels from higher to lower values of pressure. Thus we find the maximum speed in the flow, in the low pressure on the sides of the cylinder.

With the cylinder blocking some of the flow,  must be greater than  somewhere in the plane through the center of the cylinder and transverse to the flow.

Comparison with flow of a real fluid past a cylinder 

The symmetry of this ideal solution has a stagnation point on the rear side of the cylinder, as well as on the front side. The pressure distribution over the front and rear sides are identical, leading to the peculiar property of having zero drag on the cylinder, a property known as d'Alembert's paradox. Unlike an ideal inviscid fluid, a viscous flow past a cylinder, no matter how small the viscosity, will acquire a thin boundary layer adjacent to the surface of the cylinder. Boundary layer separation will occur, and a trailing wake will exist in the flow behind the cylinder. The pressure at each point on the wake side of the cylinder will be lower than on the upstream side, resulting in a drag force in the downstream direction.

Janzen–Rayleigh expansion
The problem of potential compressible flow over circular cylinder was first studied by O. Janzen in 1913 and by Lord Rayleigh in 1916 with small compressible effects. Here, the small parameter is square of the Mach number , where  is the speed of sound. Then the solution to first-order approximation in terms of the velocity potential is

where  is the radius of the cylinder.

Potential flow over a circular cylinder with slight variations

Regular perturbation analysis for a flow around a cylinder with slight perturbation in the configurations can be found in Milton Van Dyke (1975). For more detailed analyses and discussions, readers are referred to Milton Van Dyke's 1975 book Perturbation Methods in Fluid Mechanics.

Slightly distorted cylinder

Here the radius of the cylinder is not , but a slightly distorted form . Then the solution to first-order approximation is

Slightly pulsating circle

Here the radius of the cylinder varies with time slightly so . Then the solution to first-order approximation is

Flow with slight vorticity

In general, the free-stream velocity  is uniform, in other words , but here a small vorticity is imposed in the outer flow.

Linear shear

Here a linear shear in the velocity is introduced.

where  is the small parameter. The governing equation is

Then the solution to first-order approximation is

Parabolic shear

Here a parabolic shear in the outer velocity is introduced.

Then the solution to the first-order approximation is

where  is the homogeneous solution to the Laplace equation which restores the boundary conditions.

Slightly porous cylinder

Let  represent the surface pressure coefficient for an impermeable cylinder:

where  is the surface pressure of the impermeable cylinder. Now let  be the internal pressure coefficient inside the cylinder, then a slight normal velocity due to the slight porousness is given by

but the zero net flux condition

requires that . Therefore,

Then the solution to the first-order approximation is

Corrugated quasi-cylinder

If the cylinder has variable radius in the axial direction, the -axis, then the solution to the first-order approximation in terms of the three-dimensional velocity potential is

where  is the modified Bessel function of the first kind of order one.

See also
Joukowsky transform
Kutta condition
Magnus effect

References

Fluid dynamics